The 1970 Miami Hurricanes football team represented the University of Miami for the 1970 NCAA University Division football season. The Hurricanes played their home games at the Miami Orange Bowl in Miami, Florida. The team was led by seventh-year head coach Charlie Tate until he resigned after the first two games of the season. Walt Kichefski took over as interim head coach for the remainder of the season. Miami finish with a record of 3–8.

Schedule

Roster

References

Miami
Miami Hurricanes football seasons
Miami Hurricanes football